Propebela fidicula is a species of sea snail, a marine gastropod mollusk in the family Mangeliidae.

Description
The length of the shell attains 11.5 mm

The dirty white shell contains 7 broadly shouldered whorls. These show; about twenty-four longitudinal plications, crossed and decussated by more crowded delicate revolving lines.

Distribution
This marine species occurs from the Aleutian Islands, Alaska to the Salish Sea and the Puget Sound.

References

 A.A. Gould (1849), Proc. Boston Soc. Nat. Hist., vol. 3, p. 141
 Bogdanov, IP. "New Species of Gastropods of the genus Oenopotina (Gastropoda, Turridae) from the Far-East Seas of the USSR." Zoologichesky Zhurnal 64.3 (1985): 448–453.

External links
  Dall, William Healey. Summary of the marine shellbearing mollusks of the northwest coast of America: from San Diego, California, to the Polar Sea, mostly contained in the collection of the United States National Museum, with illustrations of hitherto unfigured species. No. 112. Govt. print. off., 1921   
 
 

fidicula
Gastropods described in 1849